Zaluscodes is a genus of crane fly in the family Limoniidae.

Distribution
New Zealand.

Species
Z. aucklandicus Lamb, 1909

References

Catalogue of the Craneflies of the World

Limoniidae
Diptera of Australasia